Penta DB was an engine model produced by AB Pentaverken. The 1929 introduced  engine was a side-valve engine with a cast-iron block and seven main bearings, and the first straight-6 engine used in Volvos. Four other variants followed after. These engines powered all six-cylinder Volvo passenger cars and taxi cabs, as well as the company's small trucks between 1929 and 1958.

Versions:

See also 
 List of Volvo engines

References
 Volvo Personvagnar-från 20-tal till 80-tal av Björn-Eric Lindh, 1984.   

Pentadb
Volvo